Albania participated in the Eurovision Song Contest 2013 in Malmö, Sweden, with the song "Identitet" performed by Adrian Lulgjuraj and Bledar Sejko. Its selected entry was chosen through the national selection competition Festivali i Këngës organised by Radio Televizioni Shqiptar (RTSH) in December 2012. Prior to the contest, the song was promoted by a music video and a live performance, the latter of which was in the Netherlands.
Albania was drawn to compete in the second semi-final of the Eurovision Song Contest, which took place on 16 May 2013. Performing as number 14th, the nation was not announced among the top 10 entries of the second semi-final and therefore failed to qualify for the final, marking Albania's fourth non-qualification in the contest.

Background 

The first entry was performed by Anjeza Shahini with the song "The Image of You" and finished in the seventh place, the nation's second-highest placing to date. During its tenure in the contest, Albania failed to qualify for the final three times, with the  entry being the most recent non-qualifier.

Before Eurovision

Festivali i Këngës 

The national broadcaster of Albania, Radio Televizioni Shqiptar (RTSH), organised the 51st edition of Festivali i Këngës in order to select their participant for the Eurovision Song Contest 2013. The competition consisted of two semi-finals on 20 and 21 December, respectively, and the grand final on 22 December 2012, being held at the Palace of Congresses in Tirana. The three live shows were hosted by Albanian television presenter Enkel Demi and Albanian model Floriana Garo. 
Prior to the scheduled event, RTSH opened a submission period between July and 9 October 2012 for artists and composers to participate in Festivali i Këngës, during which they received approximately 65 applications. The list of the competing artists and songs was officially revealed on 1 November, with them being shortlisted to compete in the two semi-finals of the contest. On 30 November 2012, the broadcaster announced the running order of the two semi-finals.

Competing entries 
Key:
 Withdrawn

Shows

Semi-finals 

The two semi-finals of Festivali i Këngës took place on 20 December and 21 December 2012 and were broadcast at 20:30 (CET) on the respective dates. During the semi-finals, guest performances were featured from Hungary's Eurovision Song Contest 2012 representative Compact Disco and Bosnia and Herzegovina's Eurovision Song Contest 2006 representative Hari Mata Hari, respectively. The highlighted contestants in the tables below qualified for the grand final.

Final 

The grand final of Festivali i Këngës took place on 22 December 2012 and was broadcast live at 20:30 (CET). 17 songs competed in it and the winner was determined by the combination of the votes from a seven-member jury panel, consisting of Joseph Mizzi (Malta), Justina Aliaj (Albania), Nicola Caligiore (Italy), Petrit Ymeri (Albania), Sokol Shupo (Albania), Szilva Puspok (Hungary) and Zef Coba (Albania). Adrian Lulgjuraj and Bledar Sejko emerged as the winning artists and were simultaneously announced as Albania's representative for the Eurovision Song Contest 2013.

Promotion 

A music video for "Identitet" premiered via the official YouTube channel of the Eurovision Song Contest on 12 March 2013. For promotional purposes, Lulgjuraj and Sejko embarked on a small tour with live performances at various events related to the contest, including in the Netherlands.

At Eurovision 

The Eurovision Song Contest 2013 took place at Malmö Arena in Malmö, Sweden, and consisted of two semi-finals held on 14 and 16 May, respectively, and the grand final on 18 May 2013.

On 17 January 2013, a special allocation draw was held in Malmö that placed each country into one of the two semi-finals, as well as which half of the show they would perform in. Albania was placed into the second semi-final, to be held on 16 May, and was scheduled to perform in the second half of the show. Once all the competing songs for the contest had been released, the running order for the semi-finals was decided by the producers of the contest rather than through another draw, for preventing similar songs being placed next to each other; Albania was set to perform in position 14, following  and preceding . At the end of the second semi-final, the country was not announced among the top 10 entries and therefore failed to qualify for the final, marking Albania's fourth non-qualification in the Eurovision Song Contest.

Voting 

The tables below visualise a breakdown of points awarded to Albania in the second semi-final of the Eurovision Song Contest 2013, as well as by the country for both the second semi-final and grand final.

Points awarded to Albania

Points awarded by Albania

Notes and references

Notes

References

External links  

 

2013
Countries in the Eurovision Song Contest 2013
2012
Eurovision
Eurovision